is a railway station on the Keio Line in Setagaya, Tokyo, Japan, operated by the private railway operator Keio Corporation.

The station is named after the nearby Roka Kōshun-en, a park to commemorate Japanese novelist Roka Tokutomi (1868-1927). The park is located approximately one kilometer south of the station.  Despite the name, Hachimanyama Station is marginally closer to the park itself.

Station layout
This station has two ground-level side platforms serving two tracks.

Platforms

History
The station opened on April 15, 1913, initially named . It was renamed on September 1, 1937.

References

Keio Line
Stations of Keio Corporation
Railway stations in Tokyo
Railway stations in Japan opened in 1913